Polly is a female given name.

Polly may also refer to:

Arts, entertainment, and media

Fictional characters
 See Polly

Films
Polly (film), a 1989 television musical adaptation of the book Pollyanna, starring Keshia Knight Pulliam and Phylicia Rashad
Along Came Polly, a 2004 American romantic comedy film

Literature
Polly (North novel), by Freya North
Polly, a romantic novel by Marion Chesney
Polly, by Douglas Goldring (1917)
Polly, a Mills & Boon novel by Betty Neels
Polly, by Jennie Tremaine (1987)

Music
"Polly' (Nirvana song), the sixth song on Nirvana's second album Nevermind (1991), written by Kurt Cobain
Polly (opera), with text by John Gay and music by Johann Christoph Pepusch, the sequel to Gay's The Beggar's Opera
"Polly" (The Kinks song), 1964
"Polly", a 1959 jazz song by Duke Ellington
"Polly", a 2019 song by Moses Sumney from Græ
"Polly", a 1969 song by Dillard & Clark from Through the Morning, Through the Night

Ships
Polly (brig), an American sailing ship that was damaged in a hurricane in 1811 and drifted for six months
, a United States Navy patrol vessel in commission from 1917 to 1919

Other uses
Polly (peanut), a Norwegian peanut snack brand
Polly (robot), an early vision-based mobile robot
5278 Polly, an asteroid
Matthew Polly (born 1971), American author
Polly and Molly, genetically engineered sheep

See also
Poly (disambiguation)
Pollyanna (disambiguation)
Polly Perkins (disambiguation)
Pretty Polly (disambiguation)